The 151st Fighter Escadrille of the Polish Air Force was one of the fighter units of the Polish Army in 1939.

History
In September 1939 the 121st Fighter Escadrille was attached to the Operational Group Narew.

Crew and equipment
On 1 September 1939 the escadrille had 10 PZL P.7a airplanes.

The air crew consisted of: commanding officer por. pil. Józef Brzeziński his deputy por. pil. Marian Wesołowski and 16 other pilots:

 ppor. pil. Jan Grzech
 ppor. pil. Wiktor Szulc
 pchor. pil. Michał Andruszko
 pchor. pil. Stanisław Andrzejewski
 pchor. pil. Józef Bodnar
 pchor. pil. Marian Łukaszewicz
 pchor. pil. Zygmunt Słomski
 pchor. rez. pil. Jerzy Pawlak
 pchor. rez. pil. Stefan Sawicki
 kpr. pil. Czesław Cichoń
 kpr. pil. Eugeniusz Hofman
 kpr. pil. Tadeusz Kawałkowski
 st. szer. pil. Michał Brzezowski
 st. szer. pil. Bronisław Kościk
 st. szer. pil. Ryszard Lewczyński
 st. szer. pil. Włodzimierz Marchewicz

See also
Polish Air Force order of battle in 1939

References
 

Polish Air Force escadrilles